Gabo Alfredo Jalil Mejía (born 11 December 1962) is a Honduran politician. He served as deputy of the National Congress of Honduras representing the Liberal Party of Honduras for Francisco Morazán during the 2006-10 period.

References

1962 births
Living people
People from Francisco Morazán Department
Deputies of the National Congress of Honduras
Liberal Party of Honduras politicians